John Fenton (3 July 1791 – 25 July 1863) was a British politician.

Born at Lower Crimble Farm, Fenton lived in Rochdale, where he worked as a banker.  At the 1832 UK general election, he stood for the Whigs in Rochdale.  He won the seat, but was defeated at the 1835 UK general election.  In 1837, a by-election arose in the town, which he won with a majority of 25.  He held the seat in the 1837 UK general election, but chose not to contest it in 1841.

Fenton's son Roger became a noted photographer. Another son Arthur married the novelist Gertrude Fenton

References

1791 births
1863 deaths
English bankers
Members of the Parliament of the United Kingdom for Rochdale
People from Rochdale
UK MPs 1832–1835
UK MPs 1835–1837
UK MPs 1837–1841
Whig (British political party) MPs for English constituencies